The Language Conservancy is a nonprofit organization that with an interest in the Lakota language, Assiniboine language, Crow language and the Hidatsa language.

The Language Conservancy is currently focused largely on indigenous languages in the United States.

External links 
The Language Conservancy
Lakota elders helped a white man preserve their language. Then he tried to sell it back to them - Founder of Language Conservancy banished from Standing Rock Indian Reservation

Linguistics organizations
Native American language revitalization